Major-General Andrew Linton Watson   (9 April 1927 – 12 July 2022) was a British Army officer.

Life and career
Educated at Wellington College, Watson was commissioned into the Black Watch in 1946. He became commanding officer of the 1st Bn Black Watch in 1969 and in that role was deployed to Northern Ireland during the Troubles. He went on to be commander of 19 Airportable Brigade in 1972, British Military Attaché in Washington, D.C. in 1975 and General officer Commanding Eastern District in 1977. His last appointment was as Chief of Staff, Allied Forces Northern Europe in 1980 before retiring in 1982.

Watson died on 12 July 2022, at the age of 95.

References

 

1927 births
2022 deaths
Companions of the Order of the Bath
British Army generals
People educated at Wellington College, Berkshire
Black Watch officers
British military personnel of The Troubles (Northern Ireland)